Jošanica is a village in the municipality of Sokobanja, Serbia. According to the 2002 census, the village has a population of 898 people.

References

External links

Populated places in Zaječar District